The lesser shortwing (Brachypteryx leucophris) is a species of chat. This species is now classified in the family Muscicapidae.

It is found in south-eastern Asia, Sumatra, Java and the Lesser Sundas. Its natural habitat is subtropical or tropical moist montane forests.

References

lesser shortwing
Birds of Eastern Himalaya
Birds of South China
Birds of Southeast Asia
lesser shortwing
Taxonomy articles created by Polbot